The Hero of the Soviet Union was the highest distinction of the Soviet Union. It was awarded 12,775 times. Due to the large size of the list, it has been broken up into multiple pages.

Military personnel

Partisans

Cosmonauts

Test and Arctic pilots

Leaders

References

Russian Ministry of Defence Database «Подвиг Народа в Великой Отечественной войне 1941—1945 гг.» [Feat of the People in the Great Patriotic War 1941-1945] (in Russian).

Lists of Heroes of the Soviet Union